Abraham "Ab" Klink (born 2 November 1958) is a retired Dutch politician of Christian Democratic Appeal (CDA) and sociologist. He is a corporate director of the VGZ Cooperative since 1 January 2014 and a professor at the Vrije Universiteit Amsterdam for Healthcare, Labor and Political Guidance since 1 January 2011.

Decorations

References

External links

Official
  Prof.Dr. A. (Ab) Klink Parlement & Politiek
  Prof.Dr. A. Klink (CDA) Eerste Kamer der Staten-Generaal

 

1958 births
Living people
Christian Democratic Appeal politicians
Dutch corporate directors
Dutch education writers
Dutch nonprofit directors
Dutch political writers
Dutch jurists
Dutch speechwriters
Dutch sociologists
Erasmus University Rotterdam alumni
Leiden University alumni
Academic staff of Leiden University
Members of the House of Representatives (Netherlands)
Members of the Senate (Netherlands)
Ministers of Health of the Netherlands
Ministers of Sport of the Netherlands
Officers of the Order of Orange-Nassau
People from Capelle aan den IJssel
People from Goedereede
Politicians from Rotterdam
Protestant Church Christians from the Netherlands
Reformed Churches Christians from the Netherlands
Academic staff of Vrije Universiteit Amsterdam
20th-century Dutch civil servants
20th-century Dutch educators
20th-century Dutch male writers
20th-century Dutch politicians
21st-century Dutch businesspeople
21st-century Dutch civil servants
21st-century Dutch educators
21st-century Dutch male writers
21st-century Dutch politicians